Mofar River is a west-flowing river of central Ethiopia, and part of the watershed of the Abay. Part of its course is in a deep canyon.

See also

List of rivers of Ethiopia

References 

Nile basin
Rivers of Ethiopia